Artemyevskaya is a rural locality (a village) in Gorodetskoye Rural Settlement, Kichmengsko-Gorodetsky District, Vologda Oblast, Russia. The population was 11 as of 2002.

Geography 
Artemyevskaya is located 39 km northwest of Kichmengsky Gorodok (the district's administrative centre) by road. Rossoulinskaya is the nearest rural locality.

References 

Rural localities in Kichmengsko-Gorodetsky District